Shannon Lee Day (born January 5, 1970) is an American rower. She competed in the women's eight event at the 1992 Summer Olympics.

References

External links
 

1970 births
Living people
American female rowers
Olympic rowers of the United States
Rowers at the 1992 Summer Olympics
Rowers from Seattle
21st-century American women